Electorates in New Zealand were initially created for election to the first parliament in 1853. Since then there have been numerous changes, perhaps the largest being in 1996 for the introduction of MMP.

General electorates

Māori electorates 
The first four Māori electorates were established for special elections in 1868, during the term of the fourth parliament. These four seats remained until the country's change to a mixed-member proportional system in 1996, when a large number of general electorate seats were changed as well.

Mining electorates 
The goldmining electorates were created to represent the significant mining populations of the West Coast.

References 
 https://www.parliament.nz/en/mps-and-electorates/historical-electorate-profiles/
https://vote.nz/enrolling/get-ready-to-enrol/find-your-electorate-on-a-map/

Electorates
 
New Zealand